Festa é Festa (also known as Festa é Festa 3: Cruzeiro in part 2 of season 3 and Festa é Festa 4: Verão in season 4) (English: Life is a Party) is a Portuguese telenovela broadcast and produced by TVI. It was announced on March 8, 2021 by Cristina Ferreira, and premiered on April 26, 2021. The plot is developed by Roberto Pereira, with some scenes being shot in Ribatejo.

Plot 
Festa é Festa tells the story of a village lost in time (like so many others in Portugal) and that this year is getting ready for the biggest and best village festival ever because it’s the 100th birthday of the village’s greatest benefactor. So everybody wants to shine at this festival, with their eyes on the old woman’s inheritance, and sparing no effort (as they’ve been doing for over 20 years, but the old woman just won’t die…). In Lisbon, the old woman’s impoverished son (a social climber and somewhat of a snob) has a plan to send his daughter (the old woman’s great-granddaughter) to the village so that she can build a relationship with the old woman, but with the excuse that his daughter is going there to recover from an unhappy love affair. And this is when this cosmopolitan, high-tech young woman from Lisbon, who is rather arrogant, ends up in this backwater against her will, with no 5G, cable TV, etc. Things are not looking good, but in the middle of it all, she falls in love with a young villager, who knows little or nothing about the world outside the village. In other words, two people from two completely different and opposing worlds. This young man is the son of the president of the parish council. Who is also the president of the festival committee. And the president of the local social club. And the football club. And a gravedigger. Basically, everything. A peacock who thinks he’s lord of the village. Everything his son criticizes and doesn’t want for himself. This is how, in such a typical Portuguese village, as they prepare as far in advance as possible for the festival of the year (there will be TV coverage and reporting by TVI), two young people from completely different worlds will experience love, proving that, in almost everything in life, the beauty of things lies in their simplicity…

Cast

Series overview

Specials

References

External links 

 

2021 telenovelas
Portuguese telenovelas
Televisão Independente telenovelas
Portuguese-language telenovelas
2021 Portuguese television series debuts
Television shows filmed in Portugal